Turak may refer to:
 Turac, a comic character
 Turak, Iran, a village in Khuzestan Province
 Turak, South Khorasan, a village in South Khorasan Province